The Romanian Mioritic Shepherd Dog is a large breed of livestock guardian dog that originated in the Carpathian Mountains of Romania.

Description

Appearance
This massive dog is covered in thick fluffy hair. It may be white, with or without pale grey or cream patches, or pale grey or cream all over. The dog should have a "vigorous" appearance. Sexual dimorphism is evident in this breed, with males being significantly larger than females.

Temperament

This breed has discipline as one of its main characteristics. It is a calm and well-mannered dog. As this dog was used as a herd protector, it is very attached to family and goes all the way when protecting those it is attached to. Because of this dog's ability to bond strongly with his master, training should only be started once the Mioritic puppy is already accustomed to the owner/trainer.

History
The breed was provisionally recognized by the FCI on July, 6th, 2005 in Buenos Aires. Nowadays it has reached the state of definite recognition.

Its name comes from the Romanian word mioară, which means young sheep.

Health
The breed has a life expectancy of about 12–14 years.

See also
 Dogs portal
 List of dog breeds
Carpathian Shepherd Dog
Bucovina Shepherd Dog
Romanian Raven Shepherd Dog

References

Dog breeds originating in Romania
Livestock guardian dogs
FCI breeds